ROKS Sokcho (PCC-778) is a South Korean  of the Republic of Korea Navy (ROKN). Sokcho was decommissioned on 30 December 2022.

Design

Armament

The ship's armament consists of:
 Boeing RGM-84 Harpoon missiles
 Two Otobreda 76 mm/62 compact guns (OTO Melara)
 Two Breda 40 mm/70 guns
 Six 12.75 in (324 mm) Mark 46 torpedoes
 Twelve Mark 9 depth charges

References

External links

 Korean Navy page on Pohang-class corvettes

Pohang-class corvettes
Ships built by Hyundai Heavy Industries Group
1989 ships